Yi Hae-won or Lee Hae-won (Hangul: 이해원, Hanja: 李海瑗; 24 April 1919 – 8 February 2020) was a Korean princess and a descendant of the Joseon dynasty and Empire of Korea. She was born as the second daughter of Prince Imperial Ui who was the fifth son of Emperor Gojong of Korea, her mother was one of Prince Ui's concubine, Lady Yi of Sudeok Hall. Yi was one of the pretenders, as well as her nephew, Yi Won, who claimed to be the legitimate heir to the throne of the Korean Imperial Household. Yi died in February 2020 at the age of 100 in her house on Hanam City, Gyeonggi Province.

Birth and marriage
Yi Haewon was born in Sadong Palace, which was an official residence of her family in Keijō and raised in Unhyeon Palace. After she graduated from Kyunggi Girls' High School in 1937, she then married Yi Seunggyu, who was kidnapped and compulsorily taken to North Korea during the Korean War. They had three sons and one daughter.

Coronation
Following the death of her cousin Yi Ku on 16 July 2005, members of the imperial family chose his adopted son, Yi Won, as the next Head of the Korean Imperial Household, bestowing on him the title, the Hereditary Prince Imperial of Korea (Hwangsason), representative of an inherited title from Yi Ku. Contesting her nephew's claim and appointment to the throne, Yi Haewŏn announced the restoration of the Korean Imperial Household. A private coronation ceremony was held on 29 September 2006, during which Yi Haewŏn was bestowed the title, the "Empress of Korea". According to one of her half-brothers, Yi Seok, who was another pretender, other close royal member didn't approve such a ceremony; Yi Seok himself was also invited, but he didn't attend the ceremony, for he didn't know who the members of the "Imperial Family Association of Daehanjeguk" are.

Family
Yi Hae-won's husband, Yi Seung-gyu, descended from the Yongin Yi clan (용인 이씨, 龍仁 李氏), according to the Genealogy book of the clan published in 1983.
 Great-Grandfather
 Grand Internal Prince Heungseon (흥선대원군, 興宣大元君) (24 January 1820 - 22 February 1898)
 Great-Grandmother
 Grand Internal Princess Consort Sunmok of the Yeoheung Min clan (순목대원비 민씨, 純穆大院妃 閔氏) (3 February 1818 - 8 January 1898)
 Grandfather
 Emperor Gojong (고종) (8 September 1852 - 21 January 1919)
 Grandmother
 Imperial Consort Gwi-in of the Deoksu Jang clan (귀인 장씨, 貴人 張氏)
Father: Yi Kang, Prince Imperial Ui (이강 의친왕) (30 March 1877 - 16 August 1955)
Mother:
Biological: Lady Yi Hui-chun of Sudeok Hall (수덕당 이희춘); Yi Kang's 5th concubine
Adoptive: Kim Su-deok, Princess Consort Imperial Ui (김수덕 의친왕비)
Younger half-brother: Yi Seok (이석, 李錫; born 3 August 1941)
Husband:
Yi Seung-gyu (이승규, 李昇圭; born 4 September 1917)
Father-in-law: Yi Wan-yeong (이완영, 李完榮) (1895 - 1943), the only son of Yi Ju-sang (이주상, 李胄相).
Mother-in-law: Lady Yi Hui-gyeong of the Hansan Yi clan (이희경, 李喜慶; born 1895), the daughter of Yi Deok-gyu (이덕규, 李德珪).
Children:
Son: Yi Jin-hyu (이진휴, 李鎭烋; born 24 January 1941)
Daughter-in-law: Lady Yi Ae-seon (이애선, 李愛仙)
Son: Yi Jin-wang (이진왕, 李鎭旺; 14 November 1945 - December 2019)
Daughter-in-law: Lady Park Jong-mi (박종미, 朴鍾美)
Daughter: Yi Jin-ju (이진주, 李鎭珠) (11 September 1947 - 1994), died unmarried.
Son: Yi Jin-hong (이진홍, 李鎭弘; born 24 July 1949)

See also
House of Yi
Joseon dynasty

References

External links 
 Coronation of Korea’s new empress leads to royal family controversy

1919 births
2020 deaths
House of Yi
South Korean centenarians
People from Seoul
Pretenders to the Korean throne
Women centenarians